Segue is a compilation album by the Canadian rock band Chilliwack released in October 1983.  It includes songs released throughout the band's career up to that point, as well as a preview of two tunes ("Don't Stop" and "Getting Better") that would later appear - in slightly different versions - on the band's next album, Look In Look Out, released the following year.

This compilation was later re-released as Chilliwack's Greatest Hits, although the two new tracks were presented in their Look In Look Out versions, and several other tracks that appeared in single versions on Segue were featured in their full-length album versions on the later compilation.

Track listing
"Don't Stop" (Mulford, Henderson) (4:17)
"Getting Better" (Henderson, Mulford) (3:36)
"Whatcha Gonna Do" (Henderson, MacLeod) (3:53)
"My Girl (Gone Gone Gone)" (Henderson, MacLeod) (3:55)
"I Believe" (Henderson) (3:41)
"Communication Breakdown" (Henderson) (2:19)
"Arms of Mary" (Sutherland) (3:01)
"Fly at Night" (Henderson, Turney) (4:50)
"Baby Blue" (Henderson, Turney) (3:19)
"California Girl" (Henderson) (2:57)
"Crazy Talk" (Henderson) (3:04)
"Lonesome Mary" (Henderson) (2:59)
"Raino" (Henderson) (4:22)

Chilliwack (band) albums
1983 compilation albums